The foreign exchange reserves of China are the state of foreign exchange reserves held by the People's Republic of China, comprising cash, bank deposits, bonds, and other financial assets denominated in currencies other than China's national currency (the renminbi). In December 2022, China's foreign exchange reserves totaled US$3.12 trillion, which is the highest  foreign exchange reserves of any country.

The management of foreign exchange reserves is governed by the State Administration of Foreign Exchange (SAFE) and the People's Bank of China. The composition of foreign exchange reserves is a state secret in China.

The United States has designated China a currency manipulator under the 1988 Omnibus Foreign Trade and Competitiveness Act, as engaging in “unfair currency practices” that gives it a trade advantage. In August 2019, the Trump administration, as part of the China–United States trade war, redesignated China as a currency manipulator. That designation was removed in January 2020.

Size and composition 
China's foreign exchange reserves are held by People's Bank of China, China's central bank. The total of the reserves is regularly announced by the central bank. In July 2020, China's reserves totaled US$3,150 billion, which is the highest foreign exchange reserves of any country, apparently more than twice the size of next country. In December 2022, the reserves stood at US$3,120 billion.

The exact composition of China's foreign exchange reserves is classified information. In July 2019, China's State Administration of Foreign Exchange announced that at the end of 2014, US dollar assets accounted for 58% of China's total reserves, down from 79% in 2005; adding that its share of US currency assets was lower than the global average of 65% in 2014. Analysts believe the remaining foreign exchange assets are held mostly in Euros, Japanese Yen, and British pounds.

As of 2014, China had been the largest foreign holder of U.S. Treasury securities since 2008, when it overtook Japan in this respect, accounting for about 22% of all U.S. Treasuries held by non-Americans.

In November 2022, China held US$870 billion of US government debt, 12% of the total foreign holdings of US government debt. This ranks China as the second largest holder of US government debt, after Japan.

Concern over Chinese holdings of U.S. debt
Many American and other economic analysts have expressed concern on account of China's "extensive" holdings, as part of their reserves, of United States government debt.

The National Defense Authorization Act for Fiscal Year 2012 included a provision requiring the Secretary of Defense to conduct a "national security risk assessment of U.S. federal debt held by China." The Defense Department's report in July 2012 stated that “attempting to use U.S. Treasury securities as a coercive tool would have limited effect and likely would do more harm to China than to the United States. As the
threat is not credible and the effect would be limited even if carried out, it does not offer China deterrence options, whether in the diplomatic, military, or economic realms, and this would remain true both in peacetime and in scenarios of crisis or war.”

The United States Congress introduced legislation whose aim was the assessment of the implications of China's ownership of U.S. debt. The subsequent Congressional Report of 2013 claimed that "[a] potentially serious short-term problem would emerge if China decided to suddenly reduce their liquid U.S. financial assets significantly" [emphasis in the original text], noting also that Federal Reserve System Chairman Ben Bernanke had, in 2007, stated that “because foreign holdings of U.S. Treasury securities represent only a small part of total U.S. credit market debt outstanding, U.S. credit markets should be able to absorb without great difficulty any shift of foreign allocations."

A significant number of economists and analysts dismiss any and all concern over foreign holdings of United States government debt denominated in U.S. dollars, including China's holdings.

China's holdings of US debt have been falling since early 2021 and are currently below US$1 trillion and falling.

See also
Foreign exchange reserves
Import substitution
List of countries by foreign-exchange reserves
List of countries by GDP (nominal)

References

External links
Forex Reserves, SAFE

Finance in China
Foreign exchange reserves
Government finances in China